Bonnie Campbell may refer to:

 Bonnie Campbell (politician) (born 1948), American lawyer and former Iowa Attorney General
 Bonnie K. Campbell, professor of political economy
 Bonnie Jo Campbell (born 1962), American novelist and short story writer

See also
 Bonnie George Campbell, a Child Ballad